Government Medical College, Chittorgarh, established in 2022, is one of the new medical colleges in the state Rajasthan, India. This college is located at Chittorgarh, one of the famous tourist spots in Rajasthan. The college imparts the degree of Bachelor of Medicine and Surgery (MBBS). The college is recognized by National Medical Commission and is affiliated with the Rajasthan University of Health Sciences. Like all other Indian medical colleges, students are selected in this college on the basis of merit through National Eligibility and Entrance Test. The hospital associated with this college is one of the largest hospitals in Chittorgarh.

Courses
Government Medical College, Chittorgarh undertakes the education and training of students in MBBS courses.

References

External links 

Affiliates of Rajasthan University of Health Sciences
Educational institutions established in 2022
Medical colleges in Rajasthan